Laqshya is a 1994 Bollywood film directed by Bhagwan Thakur and starring Ronit Roy, Priyanka, Tinu Anand and Paresh Rawal. The film didn't perform well at the box office.

Soundtrack

References

External links

1994 films
Films scored by Jatin–Lalit
1990s Hindi-language films